Nand Chaturvedi (1923–2014) was a socialist, a well-known Hindi poet and a littérateur.

Education and works
Born in a Brahmin family, Nand Chaturvedi had a Master of Arts degree in Hindi from Rajasthan University. He was editor of the quarterly journal Bindu from 1966 to 1972.

Apart from teaching, he used to write poems. A few of his popular works are: 
* Yeh Samai Mamuli Nahin, "these are not ordinary times", in 1983. 
* Shabd Sansar ki Yayavari, collection of essays, in 1985.
* Imandar Dunya Ke Liye, "for honest world", in 1994.
* Woh Soye To Nahin Honge, in 1997. 
* Utsav Ka Nirmam Samai, "crucial times of this festival".

Awards
He was a recipient of Bihari Puraskar of KK Birla Foundation in 1996 for Yeh Samai mamuli nahin.
Prasar Bharati honoured him with the Prasaran Sanmaan in 1998.
He was a recipient of Equality Writer Award by Astha Sansthan in January 2007.
He was chosen for year 2008's Sahitya Vachaspati, the top literary honour of the Prayag Hindi Sahitya Sammelan. It was conferred to him at Jaipur in March 2008.
He was honoured with Mira Puraskar, the highest literary honour of the Rajasthan Government.
He was also conferred with Lok Mangal Puraskar of Mumbai.

Personal life
He died on 25 December 2014; he was survived by four sons and two daughters.

References

External links
 Nand Chaturvedi at Kavita Kosh (Hindi)
An interview of Nand Chaturvedi in March 2002
Who's who of Indian Writers, book by Kartik Chandra Dutt (Sahitya Akademi) published in 1999.

1923 births
Hindi-language poets
2014 deaths
People from Udaipur
People from Jhalawar district
20th-century Indian poets
Indian male poets
Poets from Rajasthan
20th-century Indian male writers